Brissopsis parallela is a species of sea urchins of the family Brissidae. Their armour is covered with spines. Brissopsis parallela was first scientifically described in 1914 by Koehler.

References 

Animals described in 1914
parallela